Erling Braut Haaland (born 21 July 2000) is a Norwegian professional footballer who plays as a striker for  club Manchester City and the Norway national team. Considered one of the best players in the world, he is known for his speed, strength, and finishing inside the box.

Coming through the youth system, Haaland played at senior level for Bryne's reserve and senior teams. He then moved to Molde in 2017 (also playing for their reserve team), with whom he spent two seasons. Haaland signed with Austrian Bundesliga side Red Bull Salzburg in January 2019, winning two league titles and one Austrian Cup. In December 2019, he moved to German Bundesliga club Borussia Dortmund, where he won the DFB-Pokal in 2020–21. In the summer of 2022, he transferred to Manchester City for a fee of €60 million (£51.2 million).

Haaland has won several individual awards and broken various records during his career. During the 2019–20 season with Salzburg, he became the first teenager to score goals in five consecutive UEFA Champions League matches. He was the top scorer of the Champions League for the 2020–21 season. In 2020, Haaland won the Golden Boy award, while in 2021 he was named Bundesliga Player of the Season and was included in the FIFA FIFPro World11 in 2021 and 2022. With Manchester City, he has also broken Premier League records, including becoming the quickest individual to score two, three and four hat-tricks, and becoming the first player in the league's history to score hat-tricks in three consecutive home games.

Haaland has represented Norway at various youth levels. In the 2019 FIFA U-20 World Cup, he won the tournament's Golden Boot, after scoring a record nine goals in a single match. He made his senior international debut in September 2019.

Early life 
Haaland was born on 21 July 2000 in Leeds, West Yorkshire, England, as his father Alfie Haaland was playing for Leeds United in the Premier League at the time. In 2004, at the age of three, he moved to Bryne, his parents' hometown in Norway. Along with playing football from an early age, Haaland partook in various other sports as a child, including handball, golf and track and field. He also reportedly achieved a world record in his age category for the standing long jump when he was five, with a recorded distance of 1.63 metres in 2006.

Club career

Bryne 
Haaland started in the academy of his hometown club Bryne at the age of five. During the 2015–16 season, he played for Bryne's reserve team and impressed, scoring 18 goals in 14 matches. In May 2016, Gaute Larsen was sacked as Bryne manager and youth coach Berntsen was promoted to caretaker boss. Having worked closely with Haaland in other youth teams, the interim manager handed the teenager his first start, three months before his 16th birthday. His debut was a second-tier 1. divisjon match against Ranheim on 12 May.

After having initially being deployed as a winger, Berntsen put Haaland in his favoured central role as a striker after a few matches. Although he failed to score in his breakthrough season at Bryne, Haaland was offered a trial by German club 1899 Hoffenheim before eventually moving to Molde to play under Ole Gunnar Solskjær. Haaland made 16 total senior appearances for Bryne.

Molde 

On 1 February 2017, Molde announced the signing of 16-year-old Haaland. He made his debut for the club on 26 April in a Norwegian Cup match against Volda TI, scoring on his debut in a 3–2 win. Haaland's debut in the Eliteserien came on 4 June, being brought on as a 71st minute substitute against Sarpsborg 08. After receiving a yellow card in just over a minute of play on the pitch, Haaland scored the winner for Molde in the 77th minute, his first goal in the league. His second strike of the season came on 17 September, as he bagged the decisive goal against Viking FK in a 3–2 victory. In the aftermath of the game, Haaland received criticism from teammate Björn Bergmann Sigurðarson for celebrating his goal towards Viking supporters. Haaland finished his first season at Molde with four goals in 20 appearances.

On 1 July 2018, Haaland scored four goals in the opening 21 minutes against Brann, securing his team a 4–0 victory over the unbeaten league leaders at the time. After the match, Molde manager Ole Gunnar Solskjær compared Haaland's style of play to Belgian forward Romelu Lukaku, and said the club had rejected several bids for the striker from different clubs. In the following match a week later, Haaland continued his scoring run with a brace against Vålerenga in a 5–1 win. He scored his first goal in UEFA competition on 26 July, converting a penalty in Molde's 3–0 Europa League qualifying victory against KF Laçi. Due to a sprained ankle, Haaland did not participate in Molde's last three league matches of the season. For his performances in the 2018 Eliteserien, Haaland received the Eliteserien Breakthrough of the Year award. He finished the 2018 season as Molde's top goalscorer, scoring 16 goals in 30 matches across all competitions.

Red Bull Salzburg 

On 19 August 2018, Austrian Bundesliga champions Red Bull Salzburg announced that Haaland would join the club on 1 January 2019, signing a five-year contract. The Athletics Phil Hay would later reveal that prior to his move to Salzburg, Haaland was also subject of an offer from his father's former club Leeds United. He made his debut for the club on 17 February, the 2018–19 Austrian Cup quarter-finals against Wiener Neustädter, and scored his first goal on 12 May in the Austrian Bundesliga 2–1 win over LASK. On 19 July, he scored his first hat-trick for the club in a 7–1 Austrian Cup win against SC-ESV Parndorf, and followed this up with his first hat-trick in the league on 10 August, scoring three in a 5–2 victory against Wolfsberger AC. He got a third hat-trick for Salzburg on 14 September in a 7–2 victory over TSV Hartberg; this was the sixth consecutive league game Haaland had scored in, with 11 total goals. Three days later, Haaland made his debut in the UEFA Champions League against Genk, where he scored three goals in the first half of an eventual 6–2 victory, his fourth overall hat-trick for Salzburg.

In his next two matches of the Champions League season, Haaland recorded a goal against Liverpool at Anfield and a further two against Napoli, becoming only the second teenager after Karim Benzema in the history of the competition to score in each of his first three appearances. His six goals were also the most scored by any player in their first three Champions League matches. After converting a penalty in Salzburg's reverse fixture against Napoli, Haaland became the first teenager to score in his first four matches in the competition, and only the fourth player of any age to achieve this feat, following Zé Carlos, Alessandro Del Piero and Diego Costa. He then scored all three goals in Salbzurg's 3–0 victory at Wolfsberger AC on 10 November, recording his fifth hat-trick of the season and his second against Wolfsberg.

On 27 November, Haaland came off the bench to score another goal against Genk, joining Del Piero, Serhii Rebrov, Neymar, Cristiano Ronaldo and Robert Lewandowski as the only players to score in the first five matches of a Champions League group stage, and becoming the first teenager to score in five consecutive matches in the competition. However, he would fail to find the net in Salzburg's final group match against Liverpool, as his team lost 2–0 and were eliminated from the competition. This would prove to be Haaland's final game for the club; he departed Salzburg having recorded 29 goals, with 28 of these coming in only 22 appearances made during the 2019–20 season.

Borussia Dortmund

2019–20: Debut season 
Despite being a reported target of Manchester United and Juventus, Bundesliga club Borussia Dortmund confirmed the signing of Haaland on 29 December 2019, three days before the winter transfer window opened, for a fee reported to be in the region of €20 million, signing a four-and-a-half-year contract.

Haaland made his debut for Dortmund away at FC Augsburg on 18 January 2020, coming on as a second-half substitute and scoring a hat-trick within 23 minutes in a 5–3 win. This made him only the second player in Dortmund history after Pierre-Emerick Aubameyang to score three goals on their Bundesliga debut. Six days later, Haaland once again came off the bench, making his second club appearance in Dortmund's match against local rivals 1. FC Köln. He scored after 12 minutes and got a second goal 10 minutes later, helping his team to a 5–1 victory. Haaland became the first Bundesliga player to score five goals in his opening two matches, as well as the fastest player to reach that tally (56 minutes played). Despite being on the pitch in the league for only an hour, he won January's Bundesliga Player of the Month award. Haaland got a brace against Union Berlin on 1 February, becoming the first player in history to score seven goals in their first three Bundesliga games.

On 18 February, Haaland scored both Dortmund goals in their 2–1 first leg victory over Paris Saint-Germain in the Champions League round of 16. This brought his total to 10 Champions League goals for the 2019–20 campaign in only his eighth overall appearance in the competition, adding to the eight he had scored for Salzburg in the group stage. Dortmund would lose 2–0 in the return leg on 11 March however, as Haaland saw elimination from the competition for a second time in the same season. Following the Bundesliga's return on 16 May in the midst of the ongoing COVID-19 pandemic, Haaland scored Dortmund's opener of their 4–0 Revierderby win over Schalke 04, his tenth goal of the Bundesliga season. On 20 June, he scored both goals in a 2–0 win against RB Leipzig to secure second place for Dortmund, which would lead to Champions League football in the following season. Haaland concluded his 2019–20 campaign with 44 goals in 40 club appearances across all competitions played for both Salzburg and Dortmund.

2020–21: Continued individual success 

On 19 September 2020, in Dortmund's first match of the new season, Haaland scored a brace in a 3–0 win over Borussia Mönchengladbach. He scored his team's equaliser in their 2–3 Der Klassiker defeat to Bayern Munich in the DFL-Supercup on 30 September, and again found the net against Bayern when the sides met in the league on 7 November, with Dortmund losing 2–3 once more. On 21 November, Haaland scored four goals in 32 minutes of a 5–2 away victory against Hertha BSC. These five goals in November saw him crowned the Bundesliga Player of the Month for a second time. Haaland continued his goalscoring feats in the Champions League, scoring six times in the first four matches of the 2020–21 group stage, with his brace in a 3–0 win over Club Brugge on 24 November making him the fastest player to record 15 Champions League goals; he had reached this benchmark in 12 games. Hours before Dortmund's fifth group match against Lazio on 2 December, however, the club announced that Haaland had suffered a hamstring injury, which kept him out of action until after the new year.

He made his return against VfL Wolfsburg on 3 January 2021. He scored a brace away against RB Leipzig in a 3–1 win on 9 January, and another two in a 4–2 defeat to Mönchengladbach on 22 January. On 17 February, Haaland scored two goals in Dortmund's 3–2 away victory against Sevilla in the first leg of the Champions League round of 16. In Dortmund's reverse league fixture against Bayern at the Allianz Arena on 6 March, Haaland scored twice within the opening 10 minutes to give his team a 2–0 lead. However, he was substituted off in the second half after picking up a knock, as Bayern rallied to win the match 4–2. Haaland's second goal was the 100th of his senior career, reaching this milestone in 146 appearances.

Haaland scored another brace against Sevilla in the second leg on 9 March in a 2–2 draw, advancing to the quarter-finals 5–4 on aggregate. With only 14 matches played, this made him both the fastest and youngest player to reach 20 goals in the competition, also becoming the first player to score multiple times in four consecutive Champions League appearances. After missing two matches due to deep bruising, Haaland returned to Dortmund's starting line-up on 13 May for the 2021 DFB-Pokal Final; he scored a brace in his team's 4–1 win over Leipzig, securing his first title with the club. He ended the season with 41 goals in all competitions, including 27 in the league, which won him the fan-voted Bundesliga Player of the Season award, and finished the season as the top scorer of the Champions League with 10 goals, later being awarded the competition's best forward.

2021–22: Injury struggles and departure 
Haaland started off the 2021–22 season with a hat-trick over Wehen Wiesbaden in the first round of the DFB-Pokal on 7 August 2021. A week later, on matchday one of the Bundesliga, he scored a brace and assisted two goals as Dortmund beat Eintracht Frankfurt 5–2. During the first months of the season, Haaland was sidelined with a hamstring injury, returning on 16 October and scoring a brace against Mainz in a 3–1 victory. Shortly after, Haaland suffered a hip flexor injury, which sidelined him for two months. He made his return on 27 November, scoring his 50th Bundesliga goal in a 3–1 victory over Wolfsburg, setting a new record for the fewest appearances and also became the youngest player to score 50 league goals.

On 10 May, Dortmund announced that Haaland would be leaving at the end of the season to sign for Premier League club Manchester City. Four days later, he bid farewell to the club at the Westfalenstadion prior to Dortmund's final match against Hertha BSC, and scored Dortmund's first goal in a 2–1 win.

Manchester City 

On 10 May 2022, Premier League club Manchester City announced they had reached a deal to sign Haaland after activating his €60 million (£51.2 million) release clause. The deal was formalised on 13 June, with City announcing that Haaland would be joining the club on 1 July on a five-year contract. He made his competitive debut on 30 July, playing 90 minutes in a 3–1 defeat to Liverpool in the 2022 FA Community Shield. On 7 August, he scored two goals on his league debut in a 2–0 away victory against West Ham United. On 27 August, Haaland scored his first Premier League hat-trick in a 4–2 victory against Crystal Palace, and scored his second, a perfect hat-trick, four days later in a 6–0 win against Nottingham Forest, making him the quickest individual in Premier League history to score two hat-tricks, beating the previous record by 14 matches; he was later voted Premier League Player of the Month for August, his first month playing in the league.

On 6 September, he made his Champions League debut for the club, scoring two goals against Sevilla and becoming the first player to score 25 goals in 20 Champions League appearances. On 2 October, Haaland became the first player in Premier League history to score a hat-trick in three successive home games in City's 6–3 win against Manchester United, in which he also got two assists. He also became the quickest player in Premier League history to score three hat-tricks, doing so in eight league games and beating the previous record of 48 league games, set by Michael Owen in 1998, as well as halving Alan Shearer's record of scoring three hat-tricks in a 10-game spell in the 1994–95 season. On 28 December, Haaland got a brace in City's 3–1 away win over Leeds United, taking his tally to 20 in 14 matches, and became the fastest player in history to reach 20 Premier League goals, beating Sunderland's Kevin Phillips' record by seven games. On 22 January 2023, Haaland scored a fourth hat-trick against Wolverhampton Wanderers, giving him a total of 25 Premier League goals after just 19 games, thus surpassing the top scorers of the previous season, Mohamed Salah and Son Heung-min, who both scored 23 league goals across the entire season.

On 14 March, Haaland scored five goals against RB Leipzig, tying Lionel Messi and Luiz Adriano for the most goals scored in a single Champions League match. In doing so, he also reached 39 goals across all competitions, breaking City's record for most goals scored in a single season, previously held by Tommy Johnson, who scored 38 goals in the 1928–1929 season. Additionally, he joined Messi and Cristiano Ronaldo as the only players to score at least 10 goals in multiple Champions League campaigns.

During Manchester City's FA Cup match against Burnley, Haaland scored his sixth hat-trick of the season, passing the 40-goal mark across all competitions. Haaland has scored 28 goals in 26 games, putting him eight goals behind the single season record currently held by Andy Cole and Alan Shearer.

International career

Youth 
Haaland plays for Norway, and has represented them at various age groups. On 27 March 2018, while with the Norway under-19 side, Haaland scored a hat-trick against Scotland in a 5–4 victory, helping his country secure qualification to the 2018 UEFA European Under-19 Championship. On 22 July 2018, Haaland scored a penalty against Italy in a 1–1 draw during the tournament finals. On 30 May 2019, Haaland scored nine goals in the Norway under-20 team's 12–0 win against Honduras at the 2019 FIFA U-20 World Cup in Lublin, Poland. This was Norway's biggest ever win at U-20 level, as well as Honduras' heaviest ever defeat. Haaland also set a new U-20 World Cup record for most goals scored by a single player in a match, with the result additionally being the biggest win by any team in the history of the tournament. Despite the Norwegians being eliminated in the group stage, and Haaland not scoring in any other matches at the tournament, he still won the Golden Boot as the competition's top scorer.

Senior 
Due to being born in Leeds, Haaland was eligible to play for England but manager Gareth Southgate stated Haaland only wished to play for Norway. Haaland was named by manager Lars Lagerbäck to the Norway senior team squad on 28 August 2019, to face Malta and Sweden in UEFA Euro 2020 qualifying matches; he made his senior national team debut on 5 September 2019 against Malta. On 4 September 2020, Haaland scored his first senior international goal for Norway in a 1–2 loss against Austria in the 2020–21 UEFA Nations League B. Three days later, he scored a brace in a 5–1 victory against Northern Ireland. On 11 October, Haaland scored his first international hat-trick in Norway's 4–0 win over Romania in a Nations League B match, bringing his tally for the senior team to six goals in six matches played.

During the September 2021 international break, Haaland scored five goals in three World Cup qualification matches, including a second hat-trick for Norway in a 5–1 victory against Gibraltar.

Style of play 
A prolific goalscorer, Haaland has all the attributes of a complete centre-forward. He uses his sizeable frame to hold play up effectively and involve others. He has the pace and clever movement to run in behind; he can dribble and create; and he can finish with both feet and his head. He usually comes deep to collect the ball to help his team build play, often looking to spread the ball wide for a teammate, before turning and sprinting towards goal. He sometimes comes too deep for the defenders to follow him, as such he has the awareness to turn on the ball and create from a forward-facing position. In the penalty area, he makes small, sharp movements to spot an opportunity for a teammate to attempt to find him in space, and can change the line on which he is running and accelerate into that space, making him extremely difficult for defenders to read.

He uses his body well when playing with his back to goal, protecting the ball effectively as he tries to bring it under control. Given he can use his strength to secure possession when under pressure, he is also effective in providing his team's defenders with some respite following a clearance. Haaland's creativity is most apparent when he drifts into the left inside channel. His primary aim is always to get a shot off, but he also has the vision and skill to pick out a delayed run from midfield in the centre. His ability to carry the ball at pace also helps create for others, especially on the counter-attack.

Haaland idolises Zlatan Ibrahimović and Cristiano Ronaldo, but also cites Michu, Jamie Vardy, Sergio Agüero, and Robin van Persie as inspirations, and credits Virgil van Dijk and Sergio Ramos as two of the toughest defenders he has played against.

Personal life 
Haaland is the son of the Norwegian former footballer Alfie Haaland and former women's heptathlon athlete Gry Marita Braut. In a 2017 interview with Norwegian newspaper Aftenposten, Haaland said that "The dream is to win the Premier League with Leeds." His cousins Jonatan Braut Brunes and Albert Tjåland are also professional footballers.

In 2016, the music video "Kygo Jo" was uploaded to YouTube by Flow Kingz, a group consisting of Haaland and his Norway U-18 teammates Erik Botheim and Erik Tobias Sandberg.

He is a practitioner of meditation.

Career statistics

Club

International 

 Norway score listed first, score column indicates score after each Haaland goal

Honours 
Red Bull Salzburg
 Austrian Bundesliga: 2018–19, 2019–20
 Austrian Cup: 2018–19

Borussia Dortmund
 DFB-Pokal: 2020–21

Norway U17
 Syrenka Cup: 2016

Individual
 Eliteserien Breakthrough of the Year: 2018
 Austrian Footballer of the Year: 2019
 Austrian Bundesliga Player of the Season: 2019–20
 FIFA U-20 World Cup Golden Boot: 2019
 UEFA Champions League Breakthrough XI: 2019
 Bundesliga Player of the Season: 2020–21
 Bundesliga Player of the Month: January 2020, November 2020, April 2021, August 2021
 Bundesliga Rookie of the Month: January 2020, February 2020
 Bundesliga Goal of the Month: September 2021
 Bundesliga Team of the Season: 2020–21, 2021–22
 VDV Bundesliga Team of the Season: 2019–20, 2020–21, 2021–22
 kicker Bundesliga Team of the Season: 2020–21, 2021–22
 Premier League Player of the Month: August 2022
 PFA Premier League Fans' Player of the Month: August 2022, September 2022, December 2022
 ESM Team of the Year: 2019–20
 IFFHS Men's World Youth (U20) Team: 2020
 Golden Boy: 2020
 Gullballen: 2020, 2021, 2022
 Kniksen's honour award: 2020
 Norwegian Sportsperson of the Year: 2020
 UEFA Champions League Squad of the Season: 2020–21
 UEFA Champions League Forward of the Season: 2020–21
 UEFA Champions League top goalscorer: 2020–21'''
 UEFA Nations League top scorer: 2020–21
 FIFA FIFPRO World 11: 2021, 2022
 IFFHS Men's World Team: 2022

References

External links 

 Profile at the Manchester City F.C. website
 
 

2000 births
Living people
Footballers from Leeds
People from Bryne
Sportspeople from Rogaland
Norwegian footballers
Association football forwards
Bryne FK players
Molde FK players
FC Red Bull Salzburg players
Borussia Dortmund players
Manchester City F.C. players
Norwegian First Division players
Norwegian Third Division players
Eliteserien players
Austrian Football Bundesliga players
Bundesliga players
Premier League players
Golden Boy winners
UEFA Champions League top scorers
Norway youth international footballers
Norway under-21 international footballers
Norway international footballers
Norwegian expatriate footballers
Expatriate footballers in Austria
Expatriate footballers in England
Expatriate footballers in Germany
Norwegian expatriate sportspeople in Austria
Norwegian expatriate sportspeople in England
Norwegian expatriate sportspeople in Germany